Kalfas is a village and a community in the municipal unit of Tritaia, southern Achaea, Greece. It is located in a mountainous area, 5 km southeast of Portes and 7 km southwest of Stavrodromi. The community consists of the villages Kalfas and Masouraiika. It suffered damage from the 2007 Greek forest fires.

General information 
It is surrounded by mountains and hills full of pine trees and is located on the border between Achaea and Elis, about 45 km southwest of Patras. The inhabitants are mostly engaged in livestock husbandry and to a lesser extent in agriculture. In the village there are 2 to 3 cafes. A particular sight is the Chapel of the Prophet Elijah especially, especially during the feast of the Holy Spirit.

Population

Photos

See also

List of settlements in Achaea

References

External links

 Kalfas GTP Travel Pages

Populated places in Achaea